Monica Aissa Martinez (born 1962) is an American visual artist.

Early life and education 
Monica Aissa Martinez was born and raised in El Paso, Texas and has six siblings. An early connection to spirituality (her father was interested in yoga) led her to be interested in spirit, physiology, and how to portray these matters in an artistic form. Monica later attended the University of Texas at El Paso and earned a master's degree in fine arts from New Mexico State University. She was married to her husband in 1990 and moved to Phoenix where she currently lives and teaches drawing at Phoenix College. Soon after receiving her Master's, Martinez had her first solo exhibition at Scottsdale Museum of Contemporary of Art.

Exhibitions and permanent collections
Martinez's work was among that of 102 US artists whose work was selected for the exhibition "State of the Art: Discovering American Art Now," at the Crystal Bridges Museum of American Art in Bentonville, Arkansas.

Her work is in the permanent collection of Crystal Bridges Museum, the Tucson Museum of Art, New Mexico State University Art Museum among others.

References 

 
1962 births
Living people
20th-century American women artists
21st-century American women artists
Artists from Texas
New Mexico State University alumni
People from El Paso County, Texas
University of Texas at El Paso alumni 
Wikipedia Student Program